Amagne is a commune in the Ardennes department in the Grand Est region of northern France.

The inhabitants of the commune are known as Aquamagniens or Aquamagniennes

Economic and Cultural Development
The village has developed in particular thanks to its commercial but above all cultural infrastructures. Moreover, it favours sporting plurality and could envisage the creation of a new football pitch. 
In addition, it has a railway station that runs between Reims and Metz via the Intercités trains.

From an economic point of view, it only has an unemployment rate of 8.5% in 2017.

Geography
Amagne is located some 40 km south-west of Charleville-Mézières and 40 km north-east of Rheims.  It can be accessed by the D30 road running east from Rethel to the village then continuing east to Ecordal.  Route D21 also comes from Novy-Chevrieres in the north-west and continues towards Attigny in the south-east. Route D45 also comes to the commune from Ambly-Fleury in the south-west. A railway from Rethel to Charleville-Mézières passes through the north-west of the commune and there is a branch line from Amagne-Lucquy through the village and continuing east to the next station at Alland'Huy-et-Sausseuil but there is no station in the commune. The station at Amagne-Lucquey just outside the commune in the west off the D21 road serves the commune.

The Aisne river forms the southern boundary of the commune. The Ruisseau de Saulces passes through the village and a number of streams flow into this stream. Apart from the village the commune is entirely farmland. There are no other hamlets in the commune.

Neighbouring communes and villages

Administration
Jean-Baptiste Demaret (1793-1884) became mayor of Amagne in 1830 and remained so for 42 years. He was awarded the Legion of Honour.

List of Successive Mayors of Amagne

Population

Culture and heritage
The Church of Saint Martin (13th century) is classified as an historical monument. Some of the stained glass windows date from the 13th century and it has interesting furniture from the 17th and 18th centuries. The church contains two items that are registered as historical objects:
A Bas-relief (17th century)
An Altar, 3 Retables, and 2 Bas-reliefs (18th century)

Sights in the Commune

See also
 Communes of the Ardennes department

References

External links
Amagne on the old National Geographic Institute website 
Amagne on Géoportail, National Geographic Institute (IGN) website 
Amagne on the 1750 Cassini Map

Communes of Ardennes (department)